Iota Trianguli Australis (ι Trianguli Australis) is a binary star system in the constellation Triangulum Australe. It is visible to the naked eye with a combined apparent visual magnitude of +5.27. Based upon an annual parallax shift of 25.77 mas as seen from the Earth, it is located around 127 light years from the Sun. The system appears to be moving closer to the Sun with a radial velocity of around −6 km/s.

Iota Trianguli Australis is a double-lined spectroscopic binary system with an orbital period of 39.88 days and an eccentricity of 0.25. The brighter member, component A, is yellow-white hued F-type subgiant star and a Gamma Doradus type variable, pulsating by 0.12 magnitudes with a dominant period of 1.45 days.

There a magnitude 9.42 visual companion, located 16.2 arcseconds away.  The pair show as a yellow and a white star when seen though a 7.5 cm telescope.

References

F-type subgiants
Gamma Doradus variables
Spectroscopic binaries
Trianguli Australis, Iota
Triangulum Australe
Durchmusterung objects
147787
080645
6109